is a Japanese badminton player who plays for NTT East badminton club.

She retired from the National team on 26 December 2019 at the Japanese National Badminton Championships.

Achievements

BWF Superseries  
The BWF Superseries, launched on December 14, 2006, and implemented in 2007, is a series of elite badminton tournaments sanctioned by the Badminton World Federation (BWF). It has two levels, the Superseries and Superseries Premier. A season of Superseries features twelve tournaments around the world, introduced in 2011, with successful players invited to the Superseries Finals held at the year's end.

Women's singles

 BWF Superseries Finals tournament
 BWF Superseries Premier tournament
 BWF Superseries tournament

BWF Grand Prix 
The BWF Grand Prix has two levels, the Grand Prix and Grand Prix Gold. It is a series of badminton tournaments sanctioned by the BWF since 2007.

Women's singles

 BWF Grand Prix Gold tournament
 BWF Grand Prix tournament

BWF International Challenge/Series
Women's singles

 BWF International Challenge tournament
 BWF International Series tournament

References

External links 
 

1990 births
Living people
Japanese female badminton players
Sportspeople from Iwate Prefecture
Asian Games medalists in badminton
Badminton players at the 2014 Asian Games
Asian Games bronze medalists for Japan
Medalists at the 2014 Asian Games
21st-century Japanese women
20th-century Japanese women